"Chi Mai" (Italian: whoever) is a composition by Ennio Morricone written in 1971. It was used in the films Le Professionnel directed by Georges Lautner (1981), as well as in the television series An Englishman's Castle (1978). In 1981, it was used as the theme music for the BBC series The Life and Times of David Lloyd George and the BBC release of the theme reached number 2 on the UK Singles Chart.

Composition
Elements of the melody of "Chi Mai" appeared in a piece entitled "Invito All'Amore" from the 1968 Sergio Corbucci Spaghetti Western, The Great Silence. The original Italian lyrics for this song were written by Carlo Nistri and published by Ricordi (1972).

"Chi Mai" is also famous in France for being used for a Royal Canin 1980s commercial, to the point that it is more closely associated with the commercial than with its other appearances, including Dunhill in 1987. In 2002, this association was referenced by the French movie, Asterix & Obelix: Mission Cleopatra'', in a scene in which Dogmatix is chasing a legionnaire running on all fours in slow motion (like in the commercial) while "Chi Mai" is playing in the background.

"Chi Mai" was used as the melody for the last tribute to Jean-Paul Belmondo, in the post mortem national ceremony held on 9 September 2021, three days after Belmondo's death.

Online community
"Chi Mai" is also the name of the online community about Ennio Morricone.

Charts

Weekly charts

Year-end charts

References

Film theme songs
Television drama theme songs
Ennio Morricone songs
1970s instrumentals
1971 compositions
1981 singles